Seihō, Seiho or Seihou (written: 勢朋, 清豊 or 栖鳳) is a masculine Japanese given name. Notable people with the name include:

 (1614–1644), Japanese court painter
 (1941–2014), Japanese sumo wrestler and actor
 (1864–1942), Japanese painter

Japanese masculine given names